Born for You is a 2016 Philippine musical drama television series directed by Onat Diaz and Jon Villarin, starring Janella Salvador and Elmo Magalona. The series premiered on ABS-CBN's Primetime Bida evening block and worldwide on The Filipino Channel from June 20, 2016 to September 16, 2016 replacing The Story of Us. It was replaced by Magpahanggang Wakas in Till I Met You's timeslot.

An ancient Japanese myth tells the story about the Red String of Fate, it's when two people with connecting red strings are destined to meet and fall in love. A young hopeless romantic and a Celebrity Heartthrob who share the same love for music find themselves tangled up in their shared past and their connecting red string of fate.

The show ended on September 16, 2016 with a live concert finale held at the Kia Theatre, with a total of 65 episodes and it was replaced by Magpahanggang Wakas, but the schedule time is after FPJ's Ang Probinsyano, while Till I Met You took over Born for You's timeslot.

The series is streaming online on YouTube.

Plot
Sam Kazuko (Janella Salvador) is an aspiring Filipino singer who grew up in Japan. A hopeless romantic, she believes in the concept of Red string of fate, a Japanese Belief which says that an invisible red string connects a person to their destined soulmate. On the other hand, Kevin Sebastian (Elmo Magalona), a popular teen heartthrob in the Philippines and son of an OPM icon Mike Sebastian (Ariel Rivera), who popularized the song "Born For You", doubts the authenticity of love and destiny, because of the complicated relationship of his parents. Their common love for music is what brings Sam and Kevin together, but it also becomes an obstacle to their budding romance. Sam's father, Buddy (Bernard Palanca), composed the song "Born For You" for his wife, Cathy (Vina Morales), but Marge (Ayen Munji-Laurel), the daughter of the country's richest record label owner, stole the song and gave it to Mike in hopes of saving his music career. Buddy confronted Marge, and this resulted in an accident which caused Buddy's death. Following the death of Buddy, Cathy becomes an OFW in Japan in order to support Sam and her mother, Caring (Gina Pareño). She then meets a Japanese bonsai maker who offers to marry her so that she can bring Sam to Japan. As fate would have it, Kevin goes to Japan to promote his new single for his new album. There, Sam meets Kevin as they bump into each other in the Shibuya crossing. Kevin fell in love at first sight with Sam and pursues to know her even more. Kevin and Sam grows closer as Sam helps out as Kevin's translator. When it was time for Kevin to go back to the Philippines, he tells Sam he hopes to see her again. After Kevin goes back to the Philippines, Sam decides she wants to go back to the Philippines to be a singer. In the Philippines, Sam gets a job as a "Singing Delivery Girl" where she delivers flowers and sings as well.

Cast and characters

Main cast
 Janella Salvador as Samantha "Sam" P. Reyes/ Sam Kazuko
 Elmo Magalona as Kevin M. Sebastian
 Vina Morales as Catherine "Cathy" Pelayo-Reyes
 Ariel Rivera as Michael "Mike" Sebastian
 Ayen Munji-Laurel as Margaret "Marge" Marquez-Sebastian
 Gina Pareño as Caridad "Lola Caring" Pelayo
 Freddie Webb as Ralph Marquez

Supporting cast
 Kyline Alcantara as Chloe M. Sebastian
 Ogie Diaz as Desmond
 Francis Magundayao as Allan
 Makisig Morales as Jepoy
 Ysabel Ortega as Niña
 Neil Coleta as Patrick
 Young JV as Mix
 Jimboy Martin as Joms
 Alfred Alain as Funky
 Katya Santos as Tess
 DJ Durano as Leonard 
 Jett Pangan as Marcus
 Paolo O'Hara as Boogie
 Joj Agpangan as Mica 
 Smokey Manaloto as Jimmy
 Michelle Madrigal as Rodessa

Guest cast
 Ashley Sarmiento as young Sam Reyes Kazuko
 Richmont Padayao as young Kevin Sebastian
 Bernard Palanca as Salvador "Buddy" Reyes†
 Niña Dolino as Racquel
 Nyoy Volante as Mon
 Erik Santos as himself
 Karylle as herself
 Jhong Hilario as himself
 Teddy Corpuz as himself
 Raikko Mateo as Boogie Jr.
 Diego Loyzaga as himself
 Loisa Andalio as herself
 Negi as himself
 DJ Chacha Balba as herself
 Kit Thompson as Martin Gonzales
 Richard Yap as himself
 Boy Abunda as himself

Official soundtrack

Production
The project was announced on November 26, 2015. Janella Salvador was cast in the female lead role, while Elmo Magalona signed a two-year exclusive contract with ABS-CBN. Acting workshops were held the following days for Magalona and Salvador to "break the ice" and form their "chemistry." Casting began the following month, and Onat Diaz (who previously directed And I Love You So) was hired to direct. The drama is Ayen Munji-Laurel's first teleserye project in ABS-CBN, as well as Vina Morales and Ariel Rivera's reunion project three years after Maria Mercedes. Filming for the drama started in March 2016, shooting some scenes in Japan for the pilot week.

Ariel Rivera's character in the afternoon drama Doble Kara was killed off to give way for this project.

Reception

Episodes

See also
 List of programs broadcast by ABS-CBN
 List of ABS-CBN drama series

References

External links
 Official website

ABS-CBN drama series
Philippine romantic comedy television series
Philippine musical television series
2016 Philippine television series debuts
2016 Philippine television series endings
Television series by Dreamscape Entertainment Television
Television shows filmed in Japan
Television shows filmed in England
Filipino-language television shows